Hyoseris frutescens is a species of flowering plant called Żigland t'Għawdex in Maltese and Maltese Hyoseris or Gozo Hyoseris in English. This species is endemic to the Maltese islands, where it is frequent and widespread in Gozo but rare in Malta. It was first discovered on Gozo, hence its second English name, then later found on the larger island Malta, in three separate localities.  Its distribution range covers the entire western half of the perimeter on the island of Gozo, while on the island of Malta it is found on pocket isolated populations along the western cliffs of the island. It occurs in habitats such as cliffs, coastal garigue, rubble walls and boulder screes, and mainly in shady areas. The Maltese Hyoseris is one of the most archaic species in its genus to date. It is easy to cultivate by seed and it flowers all year round, but mostly in Spring and early Summer. Seeds are small achenes each with a pappus and are distributed by wind. It is a perennial species.

The leaves are succulent, similarly fleshy lobed to Hyoseris lucida, but it has more lobes on each leaf and they are less pointy. The flowers very similar to those of H. lucida, but larger, about the same size as those of H. radiata. Flowering stalks are greenish, unlike those of the previously two mentioned species.

It is a legally protected plant (Maltese Legal Notice 311/2006) and has a restricted distribution, though it is quite frequent at the coastal perimeter of the island of Gozo (2nd largest island of the Maltese archipelago).

References
SCIBERRAS, J. & SCIBERRAS, A (2009) Notes on the distribution of Helichrysum melitense,Hyoseris frutescens and Matthiola incana melitensis in the Maltese islands. The Central Mediterranean Naturalist 5(1):28-34. Nature Trust Malta publications.

External links
Info compiled by Jeffrey Sciberras

frutescens
Endemic flora of Malta
Taxa named by Salvatore Brullo
Plants described in 1988